Protected areas in Georgia make up 7% of the country's land, containing 89 different areas. Of those 89 areas, 19 are listed as managed reserves. While the earliest such reserve was founded in 1912, (Lagodekhi Managed Reserve), the actual category of managed reserve did not exist until 1996. The collective reserves saw visitor numbers of 589,098 in 2021.

Managed reserves

See also 
 Environmental issues in Georgia
 List of protected areas of Georgia

References

Georgia (country) geography-related lists
Managed reserves of Georgia (country)